The Food, Civil Supplies & Consumer Affairs Department is a department of the Government Secretariat, in the state of Kerala, India. The field department, that is, the operational wing of this administrative department, is the Civil Supplies & Consumer Affairs Department of Kerala.

References 

Government departments of Kerala
State civil supplies departments of India